WTSF (channel 61) is a religious television station licensed to Ashland, Kentucky, United States, serving the Huntington–Charleston, West Virginia market as an owned-and-operated station of the Daystar Television Network. The station's studios are located on Bath Avenue in Ashland, and its transmitter is located on a very short tower in Huntington's Rotary Park.

History
WTSF signed on as a commercial independent television station in September 1982. However, it was not successful and was soon donated to a local religious group. It continued as such until 2003 when the station was sold to the Daystar national charismatic Christian network and, with a few exceptions, ended local programming.

While it was locally produced, the bulk of the channel's programming consisted of fundraising to continue broadcasting.

Technical information

Subchannels
The station's digital signal is multiplexed:

Analog-to-digital conversion
WTSF shut down its analog signal, over UHF channel 61, on June 12, 2009, the official date in which full-power television stations in the United States transitioned from analog to digital broadcasts under federal mandate. The station's digital signal remained on its pre-transition UHF channel 44. Through the use of PSIP, digital television receivers display the station's virtual channel as its former UHF analog channel 61, which was among the high band UHF channels (52-69) that were removed from broadcasting use as a result of the transition.

References

External links
 Daystar website

Television channels and stations established in 1983
TSF
Daystar (TV network) affiliates
1983 establishments in Kentucky
Ashland, Kentucky